Archery Canada is the national governing body for the sport of Archery in Canada as recognised by the World Archery Federation.

References

External links
 Archery Canada

Archery
Canada